The 2021 Arab Futsal Cup hosted by the Egyptian city of 6th of October City was the fifth edition of the Arab Futsal Cup between 20 and 29 May 2021.
Eight teams took part. Apart from Egypt and Morocco, all other participating teams (Bahrain, Comoros, Kuwait, Mauritania, Saudi Arabia and United Arab Emirates) made their tournament debut.

In this edition, the competition changed its name from Arab Futsal Championship to Arab Futsal Cup. It also marked the return of the competition after a 13-year hiatus.

Morocco defeated Egypt 4–0 in the final to win their first title.

Qualification 
The following eight teams qualified for the final tournament.

Venue

29.953885°N 30.916967°E

Squads

Group stage
The teams are divided into two groups.

Group 1

Group 2

Knockout stage

Bracket

Semi-finals

Final

Honors 

Best Player: Anás El-Ayyane  - 
Best Goalkeeper: Reda Khiyari - 
Top Goal Scorer: Achraf Saoud (7) -

Tournament ranking 
Per statistical convention in football, matches decided in extra time are counted as wins and losses, while matches decided by penalty shoot-out are counted as draws.

References

External links
Arab Futsal Cup - news.in-24.com

2021
2021
2021 in futsal
2021 in African football
Arab
Sports competitions in Cairo
May 2021 sports events in Africa
2020–21 in Egyptian football